Michelle Olvera is a Mexican actress born in Mexico City, Mexico, best known for her role as Isabela Sandoval in the adaptation of the Romulo Gallegos' novel Doña Bárbara titled La Doña. And her role as Silvia Rojas in the Nickelodeon Latin America series Noobees.

Filmography

Film roles

Television roles

References

External links 
 

Living people
Mexican telenovela actresses
21st-century Mexican actresses
Year of birth missing (living people)